Cork City Council is the authority responsible for local government in the city of Cork in Ireland. As a city council, it is governed by the Local Government Act 2001. Prior to the enactment of the 2001 Act, the council was known as Cork Corporation. The council is responsible for housing and community, roads and transportation, urban planning and development, amenity and culture, environment and the management of some emergency services (including Cork City Fire Brigade). The council has 31 elected members. Elections are held every five years and are by single transferable vote. The head of the council has the honorific title of Lord Mayor of Cork. The city administration is headed by a Chief Executive, Ann Doherty. The council meets at City Hall, Cork.

2019 boundary change

The boundary of Cork City Council was extended from 31 May 2019, taking in territory formerly part of Cork County Council. This implemented changes under the Local Government Act 2019.

The 2015 Cork Local Government Review recommended merging Cork City Council and Cork County Council into a single "super council", within which a metropolitan district council will govern the Metropolitan Cork area; however, a minority report opposed the merger. This was subsequently followed in 2017 by a report published by an expert advisory group recommending a city boundary extension. The city boundary was to be extended to include Little Island, Cork Airport, Ballincollig, Blarney, and Carrigtwohill, adding a population of over 100,000, however the final extension will not include either Little Island or Carrigtwohill. Places farther out will remain part of the county, including Cobh, Carrigaline, and Midleton, as well as Ringaskiddy, the centre of the Port of Cork. The report gives parameters for compensation to be paid by the city to the county for the consequent reduction in its revenue. The revised proposal was welcomed by Micheál Martin but criticised by some county councillors. The city council voted unanimously to accept it. Barry Roche of The Irish Times wrote that the Mackinnon Report "has proven almost as divisive as its predecessor", except with the city and county councils' positions reversed. On 6 June 2018 Cabinet approval was given for the boundary extension, to include the surrounding areas of Cork Airport, Douglas and others.

Local Electoral Areas
Cork City Council has 31 seats, which for the 2019 local elections was divided into the following five local electoral areas, defined by electoral divisions and wards.

Councillors
The following were elected at the 2019 Cork City Council election, following the 2019 boundary extension.

2019 seats summary

Councillors by electoral area
This list reflects the order in which councillors were elected on 24 May 2019.

Notes

Co-options

Changes in affiliation

References

External links

Cork City Council Boundary Extension 2019, including map
Interactive map of LEAs from 2019

City councils in the Republic of Ireland
Politics of Cork (city)